Juan Bautista Cascini (born 4 June 1997) is an Argentine professional footballer who plays as a midfielder for Liga I club UTA Arad.

Career
After eleven years in the club's youth system from 2005, Cascini was promoted into the first-team of Argentine Primera División side Estudiantes in 2016. He was an unused substitute four times during 2016, before making his professional debut in 2016–17 on 28 August 2016 in an away win to Tigre. In his third league appearance, on 7 April 2017, he scored his first senior goal in a 1–4 victory versus Aldosivi. APOEL of the Cypriot First Division loaned Cascini in August 2018.

Personal life
Bautista's father, Raúl Alfredo, was also a professional footballer.

Career statistics

Club

Honours
APOEL
Cypriot First Division: 2018–19
Cypriot Cup runner-up: 2018–19
Cypriot Super Cup runner-up: 2018

References

External links

1997 births
Living people
Footballers from La Plata
Argentine people of Italian descent
Argentine footballers
Association football midfielders
Argentine expatriate footballers
Expatriate footballers in Cyprus
Argentine expatriate sportspeople in Cyprus
Expatriate footballers in Romania
Argentine expatriate sportspeople in Romania
Expatriate footballers in Bolivia
Argentine expatriate sportspeople in Bolivia
Argentine Primera División players
Cypriot First Division players
Liga I players
Estudiantes de La Plata footballers
APOEL FC players
FC Botoșani players
LPS HD Clinceni players
Primera Nacional players
The Strongest players
FC UTA Arad players